Dorin Necula (born 23 May 1943) is a Romanian former football striker.

Honours
Steagul Roșu Brașov
Divizia B: 1968–69

References

External links
Dorin Necula at Labtof.ro

1943 births
Living people
Romanian footballers
Association football forwards
Liga I players
Liga II players
FC Brașov (1936) players